The Class BCL Bay 09 were open coaches for branch line services with the Royal Bavarian State Railways (K.Bay.Sts.B.) that were built in the early 20th century. They included those coaches listed in the 1913 fleet register under design sheet nos. 521, 6055.2 and 6055.3. As a result of remodelling they were reclassified according to the DRG’s 1930 engineering drawing register as classes CL Bay 09/21, BCL Bay 13a, CL Bay 13a/21, BCL Bay 14 and CL Bay 14/21.

Development 
With the growth of the Bavarian branch line network known as Lokalbahnen, there was a need for suitable coaches for local passenger services. Between 1909 and 1929, coaches were procured that had the characteristics of normal passenger coaches on mainline railways. In contrast to other local railway coaches, these were suitable for military transport.

Procurement 
In the period 1909–1929, 411 wagons in classes BL, BCL, CL, DL and PPostL were procured. They all had a standard floor plan, open end-platforms with Dixi gates on the steps and gangways secured only by an iron railing. Large window panes were installed instead of the composite windows that had been usual up to that point. Of the coaches built to Design Sheet 521, 18 were procured in two batches, in 1909 and 1911, from SE in Nuremberg and Rathgeber in Munich.

Career 
The whereabouts of four coaches could not be clarified in 1945 after the end of the Second World War. The rest of the coaches went into the Deutsche Bundesbahn, where they were used until the 1960s.

Design features

Underframe 

The underframe of the coach was made entirely of rivetted steel profiles. The outer side beams were U-shaped with outward facing flanges. The crossbeams were also made of U-profiles and not cranked. The wagons had screw couplings of the VDEV type. The drawbar ran the length of the coach and was spring-loaded in the middle. The coaches had slotted cylinder buffers with an installation length of 650 millimetres, the buffer plates had a diameter of 370 millimetres. The platform was shortened for the wagons built to Sheets 6055.2 and 6055.3, resulting in a shorter length over buffers.

Running gear 
The coaches had riveted half-timbered axle holders of VDEV design. The axles were housed in sliding axle bearings. The spoked wheels were of the Bavarian Type 38 design. The suspension springs were 1,764 mm long with a cross-section of 96 x 13 mm. They were eleven leaves thick. Because of the long wheelbase of 6,000 millimetres, VDEV radial axles were used.

In addition to a hand-operated screw brake located on one of the platforms at the end of the coach, the coaches also had air brakes of the Westinghouse type.

Body 
The coach body had a wooden framework covered with sheet metal on the outside and wood panels on the inside. The joints of the sheets were sealed by cover strips. The roof was gently rounded and flush with the side walls. It extended in a hood over the open end-platforms. The coaches in the first delivery series had steps of Lokalbahn branch line design with a folding last step. The remaining delivery series were equipped with main line coach steps.

Facilities 
This class of coach was originally intended for both 2nd and 3rd class passengers and had a total of 48 seats and a toilet. The 2nd class seats were upholstered, the 3rd class seats were wooden slat benches, typical of the class. 20 standing places were designated for the two end-platforms. The end-platforms of coaches built to Sheet 6055.3 and 6055.3 were shortened from 1,000 mm to 900 mm. This also reduced the length over buffers from 1,224 mm to 1,2024 mm.

Lighting was provided by paraffin lamps and heating by steam. The coaches were ventilated by static roof vents and sash windows.

Conversions 
The cars of the first two delivery series from 1909 and 1911 were converted to CL Bay 09/21 in 1921 except for two units. The upholstered seats in 2nd class were replaced by wooden slatted benches. The Lokalbahn steps were replaced by those used on main lines.

Drawings 
Here are sketches of the different variants of the vehicle type for comparison.

Coach numbering

See also 
The following coaches were also built for the Lokalbahn branch line network:
 CL Bay 06b, short passenger coach
 CL Bay 11a, long passenger coach
 GwL, goods van
 PwPost Bay 06, mail/luggage van

Footnotes

References

Literature 
 
 
 

Railway coaches of the Royal Bavarian State Railways
MAN vehicles